Wayne K. Blickenstaff (June 25, 1920 – December 23, 2011) was a highly decorated United States Army Air Forces lieutenant colonel. He was a flying ace credited with 10 aerial victories, including five in a single day, for which he was awarded the Distinguished Service Cross during World War II.

Early life 
Wayne K. Blickenstaff was born on June 25, 1920 in Pomona, California. After graduating from Pomona High School, he attended Woodbury Business College in Los Angeles, California.

World War II 
Blickenstaff enlisted in the Army Air Forces on January 28, 1942. He subsequently earned his flying wings and was commissioned as a second lieutenant. Lieutenant Blickenstaff was assigned to the 350th Fighter Squadron, 353rd Fighter Group, Eighth Air Force at RAF Metfield in Suffolk, England. He would fly a total of 133 combat missions during the war.

On December 1, 1943 he damaged an Me109 over France. The squadron moved to RAF Raydon in Suffolk the following April. Blickenstaff was also promoted to captain and damaged another Me 109 that month. He later probably downed another over Germany on June 30, 1944. He was promoted to major in August.

Ace status 
Major Blickenstaff finally scored his first official victory on November 27, 1944. Blickenstaff was leading his squadron to strafe an enemy supply depot in Germany. While near Brunswick, over 200 enemy planes attacked the American formations. Blickenstaff managed to shoot down four Fw190s despite the cowling of his own P-51 Mustang being hit by enemy fire. Since some of the oil lines in his plane were hit, Blickenstaff was forced to land at Denain Airfield in Prouvy, France. For his actions that day, Major Blickenstaff was awarded the Silver Star.

On February 22, 1945, Major Blickenstaff claimed his fifth victory of the war. While near Berlin, his squadron encountered four Me262 jets. Blickenstaff and his flight dropped their extra fuel tanks in an effort to gain speed and chased one jet for about seven minutes. Unable to catch the jet and nearing Soviet lines, his flight broke off the chase. While returning, Blickenstaff spotted another Me 262 flying below him. Gaining speed in a dive, he was able to score numerous hits on the jet, forcing the pilot to bail out. With this victory, Blickenstaff distinguished himself as a flying ace, and one of the few American pilots credited with a jet kill. Blickenstaff was promoted to lieutenant colonel on March 7, 1945.

Ace in a day status 
On March 24, Lieutenant Colonel Blickenstaff was leading his squadron on a patrol near Kassel, Germany when they encountered approximately 15 Me109s providing top cover for a similar number of Fw190s several thousand feet below them. Blickenstaff quickly dove and got behind one Fw190 and shot it down. Blickenstaff then fired at an Me109, getting several direct hits. He observed the canopy come off, but the plane crashed before the pilot had a chance to bail out.

While looking around for more targets, Lieutenant Colonel Blickenstaff observed a fellow P-51 pilot shoot down an Fw190, which crashed into a tree line. Blickenstaff then saw an Me109 coming from his rear, but he was able to out-turn the aircraft and place several hits on it, causing it to crash into some trees.

At this point, Blickenstaff observed another pilot, Major Robert A. Elder, shoot down two Fw190s as another enemy plane was on his tail. The Fw190 on Elder's tail broke off and Blickenstaff opened fire on the plane. Although only one of his guns fired, Blickenstaff was still able to shoot the Fw190 down. Blickenstaff then spotted another Fw190 and called for another pilot to shoot it down. When no one responded, Blickenstaff managed to shoot it down with his one machine gun that was still operating.

Blickenstaff claimed three Fw190s and two Me109s in 30 minutes, making him an ace in a day. Additionally, Major Elder also shot down five enemy planes. This was the only time in the history of Eighth Air Force when two pilots from the same unit destroyed five or more enemy aircraft in the same engagement. The squadron downed a total of 29 German aircraft, losing five of their own. Blickenstaff was awarded the Distinguished Service Cross for his actions that day. These were his final victories of the war, bringing his total number to 10.

Post-war 
When the war ended, Blickenstaff was discharged from Army Air Forces as a lieutenant colonel. He attended the Chouinard Art Institute in Los Angeles and became an artist/illustrator. He had three children from his first marriage and one child and three step-children from his second marriage. He retired in 1989. Wayne K. Blickenstaff died on December 23, 2011 in Charlotte, North Carolina.

References 

1920 births
2011 deaths
American World War II flying aces
Aviators from California
Chouinard Art Institute alumni
Military personnel from California
People from Pomona, California
Recipients of the Distinguished Service Cross (United States)
Recipients of the Silver Star
Recipients of the Distinguished Flying Cross (United States)
Recipients of the Air Medal
United States Army Air Forces pilots of World War II
Woodbury University alumni